Elections to Chichester District Council in West Sussex, United Kingdom were held on 7 June 1973.

The whole council was up for election and resulted in no overall control.

Election result

|}

Ward results

References

1973 English local elections
1973
1970s in West Sussex